Travis Winfrey is an actor, best known for playing Omar Kearse in the VH1 series Single Ladies.

Filmography

2019 The Family Business

References

External links
 
 

21st-century American male actors
Living people
1981 births
American male television actors
Dunwoody High School alumni